Silver Gulch Brewing & Bottling Company is a brewery in Alaska, USA. It was founded in 1998 in Fox, Alaska, outside Fairbanks.  It is one of approximately 30 breweries in the state, despite Alaska's small population and preponderance of dry communities.  It is also the most northerly brewery in America, located only a few degrees south of the Arctic Circle.  The company's brewing vessels were acquired from the defunct Conners Brewery in St. Catharines, Ontario.

In December 2012, the brewery opened a retail outlet at the Ted Stevens Anchorage International Airport.

References

External links
 
 

1998 establishments in Alaska
Beer brewing companies based in Alaska
Companies based in Fairbanks, Alaska
Companies established in 1998